Sociedade Esportiva Palmeiras, commonly known as Palmeiras, is a Brazilian professional football club based in the city of São Paulo, in the district of Perdizes. Palmeiras is one of the most popular clubs in South America, with around 18 million supporters and more than 130,000 affiliated fans. Despite being primarily a football club, Palmeiras competes in a number of different sports. The football team plays in the Campeonato Paulista, the state of São Paulo's premier state league, as well as in the Brasileirão Série A, the top tier of the Brazilian football league system.

Palmeiras was founded by Italian immigrants in 1914, as "Palestra Itália". However, the club changed its name on 14 September 1942, as a result of Brazil joining the Allies in the Second World War against Italy ("Itália" in Portuguese) and the Axis powers. Since then, Palmeiras has won 17 top-tier national competitions, including a record 11 Campeonato Brasileiro Série A, 4 Copas do Brasil, 1 Copa dos Campeões, and 1 Supercopa do Brasil making it the most successful club in top-tier domestic competitions in Brazil. In international club football, the Big Green has won the first ever Intercontinental Cup known as International Champions Cup or ‘Copa Rio’ in 1951, the 1999, 2020 and 2021 Copa Libertadores, the 2022 Recopa Sudamericana, and the 1998 Copa Mercosul. The club has also been successful at a regional level as they have won 5 Interstate titles (Torneio Rio – São Paulo), and 24 State Championship titles (Campeonato Paulista).

Palmeiras currently occupies the second position on both CBF and CONMEBOL rankings, and was the first Brazilian club to win the IFFHS Men's Club World Ranking in 2021.

The squads for all five FIFA World Cups won by Brazil have had at least one Palmeiras player in them.

History

Palestra is born – opening game
At the beginning of the 20th century, several young Italians decided to start a club whose main goal was to form a football team that would be representative of the Italian community, and face the big names of São Paulo's football elite. Just over three decades earlier, Italy had been unified – a fact that was not known to some Italian-Brazilians and to some non-Italian Brazilians.

There were numerous Italian clubs, but each one represented an Italian province or was geared to activities other than football. At the time, the game was starting to take hold and drew many players and fans.

The founders of the club sought out the Fanfulla newspaper, which was the media outlet that defended the interests of Italians in Brazil, and entrusted young Vincenzo Ragognetti – another supporter of the idea – to draft an invitation to those interested in forming a sports club.

After several meetings, 46 interested individuals (led by Luigi Marzo and Luigi Cervo) gathered at the Alhambra Room on what is now Rua do Riachuelo, and founded a sports club for all Italian-Brazilians named "Palestra Italia". Ezequiel Simone was named club president. The Italian Consulate in São Paulo became interested in the new club because it would help spread the word among Italians that their country now had one flag and one anthem.

After some initial difficulties, Palestra Italia played its first game in the town of Votorantim (São Paulo State) – beating Savoia 2–0 with goals from Bianco and Alegretti to win the Taça Savoia, the club's first title.

1920–1945 – First state title and purchase of the stadium

In 1916, the team joined the city's main sports league and played its first official championship match. The following year it would be runner-up in the São Paulo State Championship, facing Corinthians for the first time. Palestra won that initial game 3–0 with three goals from Caetano; it also won the rematch 3–1 of what would become the team's chief rivalry. In 1920, Palestra Italia captured the São Paulo State championship with a victory over the rugged Paulistano squad in the deciding match.

Palestra continued to grow as a sports club and also began acquiring more assets. Estádio Palestra Itália, purchased in 1920, was remodeled and expanded in 1933 – when it became the first Brazilian stadium with concrete grandstands and barbed-wire fences. Starting in 1964, the playing field would be suspended, which gave fans a complete, broad view and also created space in the lower levels.

The club continued to grow and win more championships, and at the outset of the 1930s became the three-time São Paulo State football and basketball champion – a feat that prompted Palestra fans to chant in celebration: "With the feet or with the hands, Palestra is the best in the land."

A Leader Dies, A Champion is Born

In 1942 during World War II, the government of President Getúlio Vargas issued a decree banning any organization from using names related to the Axis Powers (Germany, Italy, and Japan). Palestra Italia was forced to change its name and became Palestra São Paulo ("palestra" is a Greek word, loosely translated as "gymnasium," which therefore did not violate this rule). However, the change still did not soothe political and sporting pressures to alter the name completely. At risk of forfeiting all its assets to other clubs and being ejected from the championship that it currently led, Palestra was forced to change its name a second time. The night before the last game of the state championship, scheduled for 20 September 1942, the Palestra board of directors held a heated meeting and changed the club's name. When the debate reached its peak, Dr. Mario Minervino took the floor and asked club Secretary, Dr. Pascoal W. Byron Giuliano, to note in the minutes:

– "They don't want us to be Palestra, so then we shall be Palmeiras – born to be champions."

Tensions flared during the final league match, where Palmeiras's opponent was São Paulo Futebol Clube (SPFC), which was laying claim to the assets of the former Palestra Italia.

Palmeiras took the field carrying the Brazilian flag under the leadership of army Captain Adalberto Mendes. Palmeiras was leading the match by 3–1 when a penalty was given in its favor. At that moment, the SPFC ordered its players to consider the Palmeiras squad an enemy of the homeland and pulled its side off the field amid jeers from even the club's own fans. The celebrations began on the spot. The next day, newspapers contained a photograph of Palmeiras entering the field with the headline: "A Leader Dies, A Champion is Born."

International Clubs’ Tournament (Copa Rio): The first club Intercontinental Cup and the embryo of modern club international championships

In January 1951, the Brazilian sports newspaper O Globo Sportivo ran a lead story reporting that FIFA President Jules Rimet would grant unconditional support to holding a world club championship in Rio de Janeiro.

The first Copa Rio was held in 1951, with the participation of eight squads, divided into two brackets of four teams apiece: Vasco da Gama (Brazil), Austria Vienna (Austria), Nacional (Uruguay), and Sporting Lisbon (Portugal), playing in Rio; and Palmeiras (Brazil), Juventus (Italy), Red Star (Yugoslavia), and Olympique (France) playing in São Paulo. 
Clubs such as Malmo, Rapid Vienna, Tottenham, Newcastle, Barcelona, Lousanne were invited to participate in the tournament, but they were not interested, and preferred to participate in the Latin Cup with teams such as Milan and Atletico de Madrid. The importance of the 1951 Copa Rio is linked to the fact that it was the first interclub competition with worldwide coverage, having been created even before the Intercontinental Cup. The competition was organized by the Brazilian Sports Confederation, with aid and authorization from FIFA, and was sponsored by the municipal government of Rio de Janeiro. As a result, FIFA states that Palmeiras is the  holder of the title of the first worldwide club competition in history. Two editions of the Copa Rio took place in Rio de Janeiro and São Paulo, Brazil in 1951; Palmeiras was the winner of the tournament while Fluminense, also a co-organizer of the 1952 event, won in 1952. 
While FIFA statute did establish that official international competitions could only be organized by FIFA or continental confederations, this rule was only effective as of 1955, so this was not the case for the Copa Rio, which was organized by the Brazilian Federation. Palmeiras has requested several times that FIFA officially recognize this tournament as a Club World Cup, but as of yet to no avail. 

In 2006, Palmeiras prepared a document for FIFA, describing the 1951 Copa Rio in detail, in order to request official confirmation of their victory as the first ever club football world championship. The document argued that the participation of FIFA officials Stanley Rous and Ottorino Barassi in the organization of the 1951 competition was a clear indication of FIFA's blessing, and that FIFA had sent Barassi to represent FIFA in the organization of the tournament. Rous and Barassi were primarily involved in negotiations with European clubs, while Barassi also helped organize the framework of the competition. In a 1951 interview, however, FIFA President Jules Rimet praised the Brazilian initiative, but denied any FIFA involvement in or responsibility for it.

In May 2007, Palmeiras received a letter from FIFA, signed by then Secretary-General Urs Linsi, recognizing Palmeiras as club world champions of 1951. However, this decision was later reversed by FIFA president Sepp Blatter, who declared that the matter was still being evaluated.

In April 2013, FIFA General-Secretary Jérôme Valcke, again recognized Palmeiras as champions of the "first Club World Cup ever held" in written communication to the Brazilian Minister of Sports, Aldo Rebelo,.
FIFA Executive Committee recognized Palmeiras as champions of the "first worldwide club competition" in 2014, while, FIFA president Joseph Blatter stated to the Brazilian press that Palmeiras's victory had been effectively recognized by FIFA and they should therefore be considered club world champions.

On 22 July 2016, FIFA celebrated the 65-year anniversary of the 1951 Copa Rio title won by Palmeiras. On Instagram, FIFA posted: "Green is the color of envy. 'The Big Green' were the envy of the wide world # On this day 65 years ago. A Liminha-inspired Palmeiras edged a Juventus team including Giampiero Boniperti & a Danish triumvirate to become the sport's first intercontinental world club champions. 100,000 watched that at the Maracanã. One million flooded the streets of São Paulo to welcome their heroes home."

A distinction between a "worldwide competition" (worldwide in reach but that does not necessarily indicate the world champion) and a "competition awarding the label of world champion" rose in January 2017, when FIFA issued the following statement: "At its meeting in São Paulo on 7 June 2014 the FIFA Executive Committee agreed to the request presented by CBF to acknowledge the 1951 tournament between European and South American clubs as the first worldwide club competition, and Palmeiras as its winner. FIFA acknowledges and values the initiatives to establish worldwide club competitions throughout history. This is the case of tournaments involving European and South American clubs, such as the pioneering Copa Rio, played in 1951 and 1952, and the Intercontinental Cup. However, it was not until 2000 that FIFA organised the maiden FIFA Club World Cup, with representatives from all six confederations. The winners of this competition, which went on to be staged annually from 2005 onwards, are the ones officially considered by FIFA as club world champions.

On 27 October 2017, the FIFA Council changed its position: while not promoting the statistical unification of the Intercontinental Cup and the Club World Cup, in respect to the history of the two tournaments (which merged in 2005), it made the Intercontinental Cup an official world title, recognizing all its winners as club world champions with the same title as FIFA Club World Cup winners: "FIFA Club World Champions."

In April 2019, FIFA president Gianni Infantino, in an interview with Brazilian media, reiterated FIFA's perspective that only the winners of the Intercontinental Cup and the Club World Cup were officially world champions.

Also in April 2019, former FIFA president Joseph Blatter (who held office until December 2015) again stated to the Brazilian press that Palmeiras had been recognized as world club champions by FIFA in 2014.

In February 2021, the FIFA website praised Palmeiras's victory in the Copa Rio thusly: 

In any case, the Copa Rio was the first intercontinental football tournament to bring together the most prestigious clubs from the most important leagues around the world. The matches were played at the same locations in which the 1950 FIFA World Cup games had been played the year before. The tournament triggered discussions within continental football federations about exploring club football internationally, which eventually led to the launch of international championshipssuch as the European Cup (now known as the UEFA Champions League) and the Copa Libertadores.

In the end, Palmeiras won the first intercontinental championship of the pre-international era of football, making the ‘Copa Rio’ one of the most important starting points of globalization for football.

The Academy, the Brazilian giant

In the 1960s, the standard of quality of Palmeiras played – led by the one who would come to symbolize this period of football excellence, Ademir da Guia – led the Palestra Italia team to be called the "Academy" of Brazilian football.

The first Academy had Djalma Santos, Djalma Dias, Dudu, Ademir da Guia, Julinho Botelho, Vavá, Liminha and Chinesinho as some of the outstanding players.

Managed by Filpo Núñez, Palmeiras players won the most important national competition in 1965, the Rio – São Paulo championship, with stand-out performances. Blow-outs against top rivals included seven goals scored against Santos, five against Botafogo in their home stadium of the Maracanã, five against São Paulo, and another four scored against Vasco. The title came to Palmeiras in another lopsided victory against Botafogo at Pacaembú Stadium in São Paulo.

That same year, the Brazilian Sports Federation (CBD) used the entire Palmeiras roster to inaugurate the Mineirão Stadium and represent Brazil in an official national team match against Uruguay for the Inconfidência Cup. The day that it donned the green and white, Palmeiras as Brazil was victorious 3–0 over the Uruguayan blue.

In the previous year, Palmeiras had won the Rio de Janeiro Quadricentennial Cup (Torneio do IV Centenário do Rio de Janeiro de 1965) by beating the Paraguay national team 5–2 and besting Peñarol of Uruguay in the final.

By the end of the 1960s, Palmeiras won the Copa do Brasil and the Roberto Gomes Pedrosa tournament – the Brazilian Championship equivalent at the time.

These victories laid the groundwork for the second Palmeiras Academy, with players like Luís Pereira, Leivinha, Emerson Leão, Dudu, Ademir da Guia and César.

Led by Osvaldo Brandão, the team captured several titles in the 1970s. It was a three-time São Paulo state champion – emerging undefeated in one of those tournaments – a two-time Brazilian champion, a three-time winner of Spain's Ramón de Carranza Trophy, and the winner of Argentina's Mar del Plata Trophy – considered the South American Club Championship.

1980s: The lost decade

Already used to victories at the "Academy" in the 1960s and 1970s, Palmeiras fans saw the 1980s come and go without championships or titles. In 1986, Palmeiras fielded a good team – routing Corinthians 5–1 and playing a historic game in the semifinals of the São Paulo State Championship against that same rival, prevailing 3–0. Ten years after winning its last State title, Palmeiras finally arrived at the final of the state championship, but lost to Inter de Limeira.

On 29 October 1986, Palmeiras fans adopted the pig as their mascot. At a game against Santos, the rival fans were chanting "pig"; the Palmeiras crowd responded with "Come On Pig!! Come On Pig!! Olé Olé Olé..." and "Go Piiiig...." A few days later, Placar sports magazine popularized the new nickname when it published an issue with Jorginho Putinatti – the symbol of that generation – holding a pig in his lap.

There were two noteworthy events during this decade. In the 1983 State Championship against Santos, referee José de Assis Aragão scored a goal for Palmeiras in the 47th minute of the second half. Striker Jorginho kicked the ball inside the penalty area, the ball was on its way out, but hit Aragão – who was on the goal line about a meter from the goal and went into the Santos net. The game ended in a 2–2 tie – much to the chagrin of Santos.

The second unexpected event occurred on 11 November 1988, when striker Gaúcho saved two penalties against Flamengo in a game for the Brazilian Championship at Maracanã. Gaúcho was put in goal after keeper Zetti broke his leg in the final minutes of the match. The game ended in a tie, and advanced to the penalty shootout phase. During the shootout, Gaúcho stopped two shots, from Aldair and Zinho. To cap off the evening, he scored a penalty himself while wearing the goalkeeper's jersey.

In 1989, Palmeiras had another chance to win a title. Undefeated until the penultimate match, the team was eliminated when it lost to Bragantino in the semifinals of the São Paulo State Championship. The 1980s ended without significant victories, but the 1990s would make up for that.

The end of the 20th century – The Greatest in Brazil

Palmeiras found itself in the midst of a sixteen-year drought, without any significant trophies, until 1992, when the club signed a sponsorship deal with Italian dairy giant Parmalat. The deal lasted for eight years and quickly turned Palmeiras into Brazil's richest club.

In the 1990s, Palmeiras enjoyed countless achievements, winning numerous important titles. In the first full year of the relationship with Parmalat, the team won the Campeonato Paulista in 1993, beating its biggest rival Corinthians in the final, under the command of coach Vanderlei Luxemburgo and with a squad featuring Evair, Zinho, Edmundo, César Sampaio, Mazinho, Antônio Carlos, Roberto Carlos and Edílson .

That same year, Palmeiras also captured the Rio-São Paulo Championship, once again against Corinthians, and the 1993 Campeonato Brasileiro Série A. In 1994, it achieved the unprecedented feat of winning consecutive state championships and Brazilian championships, the latter victory coming against Corinthians once again.

In 1996 Palmeiras won the friendly Euro-America Cup, defeating the Bundesliga champions and future 1996-97 UEFA Champions League and 1997 Intercontinental Cup champions Borussia Dortmund by a score of 6–1. Later, the team handily won the 1996 Campeonato Paulista, scoring more than 100 goals and accumulating historic victories, such as a 6-0 thrashing of Santos FC. Rivaldo, Muller, Djalminha and Luizão were the standouts of this historic team.

Palmeiras also had a remarkable sequence of games in the 1996 Copa do Brasil, beating Clube Atletico Mineiro 5-0 (7-1 on aggregate) and defeating the 1995 Copa Libertadores winners Gremio in the semifinals, but the team eventually suffered a surprise loss to Cruzeiro EC, who would eventually win the 1997 Copa Libertadores.

In 1998, Palmeiras won the 1998 Copa do Brasil and the 1998 Copa Mercosur, both against Cruzeiro EC. The latter was the first official international cup won by Palmeiras since 1951.

1999 – The first Copa Libertadores trophy

Already famous for winning the 1991 Copa do Brasil, 1994 Copa do Brasil, 1995 Copa Libertadores, and 1996 Campeonato Brasileiro Série A, Luiz Felipe Scolari was hired as manager in 1997 and led the team to a number of important trophies, including their first Copa Libertadores.

Palmeiras faced a challenging road to the finals, defeating the defending champions Vasco da Gama in the round of 16 by 5–3 on aggregate (including coming back to secure a historic 4–2 away victory), rival Corinthians in the quarterfinals on penalties, and 1996 Copa Libertadores winners River Plate in the semifinals by 3–1 on aggregate.

The final matches were against Deportivo Cali from Colombia, the 1978 Copa Libertadores runners up. In the first leg in Cali, Deportivo beat Palmeiras 1–0. In the second leg, at Estádio Palestra Itália, Palmeiras beat Deportivo 2–1 and won the competition in a penalty shootout.

Important players from that team were World Cup winners Marcos, Zinho and Roque Júnior, as well as Alex, Evair, Paulo Nunes, and César Sampaio.

That same year, Palmeiras disputed the 1999 Intercontinental Cup in Tokyo, but were defeated by Manchester United of England. Despite enjoying the better of the game, Palmeiras had a goal from Alex ruled out, and conceded a goal after an uncharacteristic mistake by Marcos, one of the team's stars and future 2002 FIFA World Cup champion.

2000 – Four finals disputed
In 2000, Palmeiras disputed four finals. First, the team won the Rio-São Paulo Tournament after beating Vasco da Gama by 6–1 on aggregate in the final. In the first leg, in Rio de Janeiro, Palmeiras beat Vasco 2–1. In the second leg, at Morumbi Stadium, Palmeiras prevailed by a score of 4–0.

The club again reached the 2000 Copa Libertadores finals, this time against Boca Juniors from Argentina. In the first leg in Buenos Aires, the game ended 2–2. In the second leg, at the Morumbi in São Paulo, the game ended 0–0, with Boca winning the competition in a penalty shootout.

After the Copa Libertadores final, Luiz Felipe Scolari left Palmeiras, along with a number of players. Given the circumstances, Palmeiras invested in younger players and won the first ever Brazilian Champions' Cup after beating Sport Recife in the final. The result qualified the club to play in their 3rd consecutive Copa Libertadores in 2001.

At the end of the year, the club also reached the quarterfinals of the 2000 Campeonato Brasileiro playoffs and played their 3rd consecutive Copa Mercosur final, which was also their 5th consecutive CONMEBOL championship final since the second half of 1998 (1998 Copa Mercosur, 1999 Copa Libertadores, 1999 Copa Mercosur, 2000 Copa Libertadores, and the 2000 Copa Mercosur).

The young Palmeiras team eventually lost the 2000 Copa Mercosur final to a Vasco da Gama full of stars such as Romario, Juninho Paulista, and Euller. The team was called “bom e barato” (good and cheap) and their success triggered a new management philosophy in the club, which was eventually proven to not be as effective in subsequent years.

Having won key national and international competitions, Palmeiras was proclaimed Brazilian football's Best Team of the 20th Century of Brazil by the São Paulo State Football Federation (FPF), the Folha de São Paulo and Estado de São Paulo newspapers, and the Placar magazine.

2000s - Difficult years

Parmalat's sponsorship ended in 2000, leaving the club in dire straits. After an inconsistent season in 2001, with the biggest achievement reaching the 2001 Copa Libertadores semifinals, where they were defeated by Boca Juniors, the club had a dreadful year in 2002 and was relegated to the Campeonato Brasileiro Série B. Palmeiras won Série B the following year, returning to Série A in 2004.

The 2004 and 2005 seasons were rather successful, with the team finishing in 4th both years and qualifying for the Libertadores in 2005 and 2006. Palmeiras was eliminated by rivals São Paulo in the Round of 16 in both years.

In 2007, Palmeiras legend Edmundo played his last season for the club, just missing out on the top 4 in Série A in the final game of the season.

In 2008, Palmeiras arrived at a sponsorship agreement with Traffic, a sports marketing agency. The club made big investments on new players and Vanderlei Luxemburgo. This new strategy paid dividends as Palmeiras won their 22nd Paulista Championship, capped off with a 5–0 victory over Ponte Preta in the second leg of the final. Palmeiras finished 4th in the Campeonato Brasileiro, which qualified them for the 2009 edition of the Copa Libertadores.

Allianz Parque

The year of 2008 also marked the beginning of the planning phase for a new stadium for the club, as well as remodeling the social club, to prepare Palmeiras for the club's centenary year in 2014. The planned arena is now known as Allianz Parque.

In 2009, the club reached the quarterfinals of Copa Libertadores, eventually losing to Uruguayan side Nacional on away goals.
In the same season, Palmeiras came close to winning the Brazilian League, but political problems inside the club caused internal turmoil and affected on-field performances, and Palmeiras finished the season in fifth place.

From 2010 to 2014, Palmeiras played its home matches in the municipal Pacaembu Stadium, as the previous home ground Palestra Itália Stadium was demolished to accommodate the club's new arena.

2012 Copa do Brasil: Undefeated Winners
In 2012, Palmeiras won the Copa do Brasil for the second time, beating Coritiba in the final. Led by manager Luiz Felipe Scolari and captained by midfielder Marcos Assunção, Palmeiras did not suffer a defeat in the entire tournament.

Relegation and promotion
Less than three months after winning the Copa do Brasil, Scolari would leave the club due to poor performances in the league. He was replaced by Gilson Kleina, the manager of Ponte Preta, but the team failed to improve its performances and was relegated to the Campeonato Brasileiro Série B for the second time in its history after a draw against Flamengo on November 18, 2012.

In 2013, now under the administration of newly elected President Paulo Nobre, Palmeiras was easily promoted back to the first division with six games to spare, ensuring their participation in the 2014 Série A for the club's centennial season.

Palmeiras suffered a setback early on in its 2014 centennial season as head coach Kleina was sacked, swiftly followed by the departure of striker Alan Kardec and defender Henrique. Argentinian Ricardo Gareca was signed to coach the team after the break for the World Cup in Brazil, but failed to meet expectations and was sacked after a short spell. Dorival Júnior replaced Gareca until the end of the season, as the club was fighting against relegation. With first-choice goalkeeper Fernando Prass and midfielder Jorge Valdivia both returning from injury, the players led Palmeiras throughout the second half of the season as the club managed to avoid relegation and finished the season in 16th place.

2015 reformulation and Copa do Brasil title

In 2015, Palmeiras underwent an extensive rebuilding project, hiring a new coach and new football director. The club signed 25 players over the year and promoted several new talents from the club's youth teams, while almost every player from the 2014 squad was moved on. Palmeiras also improved its official paid supporters program, Avanti, eventually reaching 114,000 paid supporters.

This was also Palmeiras' first season playing in their newly built stadium, the Allianz Parque, which seated 43,713 fans and included fully covered spectator seating; it was inaugurated on November 19, 2014.

Palmeiras reached the 2015 Campeonato Paulista finals, which they lost on penalties to rivals Santos FC.

On 9 June 2015, manager Oswaldo de Oliveira was sacked by Palmeiras due to a slow start to the Campeonato Brasileiro. On June 10, 2015, Palmeiras reached an agreement with Marcelo Oliveira, recently sacked by Cruzeiro despite having won the Brazilian league with them in 2013 and 2014.

Palmeiras won the 2015 Copa do Brasil on December 2, 2015. After a 1–0 loss to Santos in the first leg, the players were received at the stadium by more than 40,000 supporters both inside and outside Allianz Parque. Palmeiras won the second leg 2–1, with both goals scored by Dudu, before winning the trophy on penalties (with goalkeeper Fernando Prass saving a penalty and converting the winning penalty). Gabriel Jesus was the great revelation of that team, while the experience of fullback Zé Roberto was also fundamental for Palmeiras to win the competition.

With this title, Palmeiras increased its supremacy as Brazil's greatest champion, with 12 national titles  (8 league titles, 1 Brazilian Champions Cup and 3 Copa do Brasil titles). As champions of the 2015 Copa do Brasil, Palmeiras also secured a place in the 2016 Copa Libertadores group stage.

2016–2018: Palmeiras back on top of Brazilian football

On 12 March 2016, Palmeiras reached a verbal agreement with Cuca to become its new manager. Palmeiras re-signed Zé Roberto, while also signing other key players for the 2016 season, including Dudu, Edu Dracena, Moisés, Róger Guedes, Jean, Yerry Mina, and Tchê Tchê.

2016 Campeonato Brasileiro Série A Champions
After a dominant year, leading the league for 29 weeks, Cuca led Palmeiras to their ninth league title, and first in 22 years, making it the club with the most league titles in Brazil. Gabriel Jesus was the team's leading scorer with 12 goals. On 27 November 2016, Palmeiras was guaranteed the title before the 38th week, beating Chapecoense at home 1–0 with a goal from Fabiano in the 26th minute. With an attendance of 40,986 supporters, this broke the old record attendance of 40,035 from 12 July 2016 against Santos.

Decacampeão of Série A (10th championship)
On 25 November 2018, Palmeiras clinched its 10th Campeonato Brasileiro title after defeating Vasco 1–0 in Rio de Janeiro. On 2 December 2018, Palmeiras played their last game of the season in front of a record-breaking crowd of 41,216. With a 3–2 win over Vitória, Palmeiras set a new Campeonato Brasileiro record for the longest undefeated streak (23 matches).

2020 – Treble: Campeonato Paulista, Copa do Brasil and Copa Libertadores Winners

In 2020, during the COVID-19 pandemic, Palmeiras beat archrival Corinthians in a historic final of the Campeonato Paulista. In the first final in the history of the competition without any spectators, Palmeiras won after beating Corinthians in a penalty shootout.

On 30 January 2021, Palmeiras, led by Portuguese coach Abel Ferreira, won the 2020 Copa Libertadores against Santos by a score of 1–0 at the Maracanã, in Rio de Janeiro. It was Palmeiras' second title in the competition. Breno Lopes scored the only goal of the match nine minutes into second-half stoppage time.

As champions, Palmeiras qualified for the 2020 FIFA Club World Cup in Qatar and earned the right to play against the winners of the 2020 Copa Sudamericana in the 2021 Recopa Sudamericana.

In March 2021, Palmeiras won the 2020 Copa do Brasil, defeating Grêmio with an overall score of 3–0. It was the 4th Copa do Brasil title for Palmeiras.

2021 – Second consecutive Copa Libertadores and IFFHS men’s world best club ranking winners
On 27 November 2021, Palmeiras won the 2021 Copa Libertadores against Flamengo, with a score of 2–1, in a single match in a decisive confrontation held at Estadio Centenario, in Montevideo, Uruguay. Once again led by the Portuguese coach Abel Ferreira, Palmeiras managed to win the second consecutive title in less than a year - the first time they ever achieved such feat in their history.

Raphael Veiga and Deyverson scored the goals for the Verdão, five minutes into the first half and into extra time respectively. Gabriel Barbosa scored the only goal for Flamengo at 72 minutes.

As champions, Palmeiras qualified for the 2021 FIFA Club World Cup in the United Arab Emirates, and earned the right to play against the winners of the 2021 Copa Sudamericana in the 2022 Recopa Sudamericana.

On 20 January 2022 the International Federation of Football History & Statistics announced Palmeiras as the winner of the Men's World Best Club Ranking of 2021. It was the first time a Brazilian club finished a year on top of this ranking.

2022: trophies and records

In January 2022, the Palmeiras U-20 squad won the traditional Copa São Paulo de Futebol Júnior for the first time, defeating rival Santos FC 4–0 in the final. This victory brought home the only major youth trophy that had yet to be won by Palmeiras, and served as the culmination of a sustained period of investment in the youth teams, beginning in 2013.

In February 2022, Palmeiras played the 2021 FIFA Club World Cup and finished in the second place after beating Al-Ahly in the semifinals, and losing the final match 2–1 in extra time against Chelsea after a penalty confirmed by the video assistance referee.

In March 2022, Palmeiras defeated Athletico Paranaense by 4–2 on aggregate and won the 2022 Recopa Sudamericana.

In April 2022, Palmeiras won their 24th Campeonato Paulista after beating Sao Paulo FC in the Finals by 5–3 on aggregate, coming back from a 3–1 loss in the first leg.

In November 2022, the Big Green won their 11th Campeonato Brasileiro after a solid season, having lost only two games (curiously the first and last legs of the tournament). The trophy was the remaining possible trophy to be won by Abel Ferreira in South America.

Current season (2023)

In January 2023, the Palmeiras U-20 squad won the Copa São Paulo de Futebol Júnior for the second time in a row, defeating América Mineiro 2-1 in the final.

Palmeiras won the 2023 Supercopa do Brasil on 28 January 2023 after scoring 4-3 against Clube de Regatas Flamengo. The match was played at Mane Garrincha Stadium in Brasilia.

Stadium

Estádio Palestra Itália (1917–2010)
Estádio Palestra Itália was home of Palmeiras from 1917 to 2010. The venue was also known as Parque Antártica because the area was a park built by the Antarctica Paulista Brewing Company in the beginning of the last century, before being acquired by Palmeiras in 1920. In the past its capacity was listed as 35,000 spectators. However, even though its grandstands were extended in the late 1990s, it held only seats 27,640 people due to regulations which enforce safety and comfort.

It was one of the most important Brazilian grounds, considering the amount of decisive and important matches played there. Examples of matches played in Palestra Itália include 1999 Copa Libertadores final, the Copa Mercosur finals of 1998, 1999 and 2000, 1996 Copa do Brasil final and several Campeonato Paulista finals.

The last official match played in the stadium was against Grêmio for the Série A on 22 May 2010, and the last match played was a friendly against Boca Juniors on July 9, 2010.

Allianz Parque (2014–present)

Opened in November 2014, the Allianz Parque has 43,713 covered seats, being 25,395 lower seats, 14,888 upper seats and 3,430 in the cabins. The stadium was built for multipurpose events. Many other facilities are in place, including an enhanced parking area, a VIP area, a media center for up to 1,000 media members, 3 restaurants and bars and an heliport. The first official game at Allianz Parque was held on 19 November 2014, between Palmeiras and Sport in the Brazilian Série A, when hosts Palmeiras lost to Sport Recife 0–2. The first official goal of the stadium was scored by Ananias.

On 14 June 2015, Palmeiras won their first Brasileirão match in Allianz Parque with a 2–1 win over Fluminense.

Average home attendances per season

Palmeiras' average attendances per year in Campeonato Brasileiro Série A

(*) Information not available.
 1 As of 12 November 2022.
 1 Source: World Football

Palmeiras's average attendances per year in Copa Libertadores

Kit

Palmeiras' first kit consisted of green jerseys, white shorts and green socks. Palmeiras' first jersey was blue jersey tribute to Italian National team. After that, a green with a horizontal white band, and a white with a red Savoy cross as the crest. Palmeiras have played in blue shirts many times as a tribute to the Italian National Team. Their supporters are also well known for creating the mancha verde (green stain) of fog and smoke when Palmeiras is entering the pitch.
 
From 2007 to 2009 Palmeiras used a third jersey: a light yellow shirt with a dark green shorts and socks, one of the most successful and best sellers from Adidas.

In 2010 Palmeiras the light yellow jersey became the second jersey, and started using a blue and white shirt, with white shorts, for their third jersey.

In 2016, Palmeiras announced the extension of the sponsorship agreement with Crefisa and FAM (Faculdade das Américas), which have exclusivity in the uniform of Palmeiras. The two companies, which are part of the same group controlled by the couple José Roberto Lamacchia and Leila Pereira, will pay Palmeiras around R$78 million ($20 million) a year, the highest amount ever deposited by a partner in the history of Palmeiras. Palmeiras uniform is among the top valuable uniforms in South America since 2016

Manufacturer and sponsors

Crefisa, a Brazilian bank, announced it would sponsor Palmeiras for the 2015 season. After their success in the 2016 Campeonato Brasileiro, Crefisa announced it would increase fundings to R$90 million.

Kit deals

Culture

Supporters

Originally, Palmeiras was a club heavily supported by Brazilians of Italian descent in São Paulo State. Over time, that distinction has reduced, and today the fan base is very diverse.

Palmeiras' largest supporters group are the Mancha Alvi-Verde (White and Green Stain, a green version of Phantom Blot), TUP (the oldest group), Acadêmicos da Savóia (the newest group), among others. There are big concentrations of Palmeiras fans across Brazil and in some places across the world known as “consulados” (consulates).

According to the famous Brazilian journalist and Palmeiras fan Joelmir Beting, which was a huge fan of the club, “it is unnecessary to explain the emotion of supporting Palmeiras to its fans, and impossible to do it to the non-fans”. This became one of the club's mottos and reflected in the walls of Allianz Parque’s home dressing room.

Rivalry

Corinthians

Palmeiras' biggest rival is Corinthians. The rivalry between the two clubs is considered Brazil's greatest, and the most intense in country, entering the conversation of being one of the biggest rivalries in the world, and considerably one of the oldest as well. Their matches are known as the Paulista Derby.

The most important matches between the two clubs were the Copa Libertadores 1999 quarterfinals and Copa Libertadores 2000 semifinals, both won by Palmeiras on penalties.

Palmeiras and Corinthians played the 1994 Campeonato Brasileiro Série A final, also won by Palmeiras 4-2 on aggregate.

Other relevant Palmeiras and Corinthians matches:

 Palmeiras 4-0 Corinthians, 1993 Campeonato Paulista Final Match - Palmeiras ended a series of 16 years without winning a championship;
 Palmeiras 1-0 Corinthians, 1974 Campeonato Paulista Final Match - Palmeiras won the Campeonato Paulista and increased Corinthians’s negative series without winning any championships to 21 years;
 Palmeiras 1-1 Corinthians, 1954 Campeonato Paulista Final Match - Corinthians won the Campeonato Paulista dedicated to Sao Paulo City’s quadricentennial.
 Palmeiras 8-0 Corinthians, 1933 Campeonato Paulista Season Match - Largest score of the Derby.

The Derby is often featured in Brazilian popular culture. The game is the central plot of Mazzaropi’s film ‘O Corintiano’ (1967), about a barber who is also a Corinthians fan that does not charge services from other Corinthians fans and does not like to provide services to Palmeiras fans.

In O Casamento de Romeu e Julieta, the rivalry between Palmeiras and Corinthians played a major role in the plot.

Santos

Santos FC is another major rival; the games between the two clubs are called the Clássico da Saudade (The Good Times Classic). Located in the city of the same name, only 76 km (47,5 mi) from São Paulo, Santos is also one of the 4 big clubs of the state.

The most important matches between the two clubs were the 2020 Copa Libertadores Final and 2015 Copa do Brasil Final, both won by Palmeiras.

São Paulo

São Paulo FC is another local rival; the games between the two clubs are called the Choque-Rei (King Clash).

The most important matches between the two clubs were played in Copa Libertadores. Palmeiras won the Copa Libertadores 2021 quarterfinals by 4–1 on aggregate. Sao Paulo FC won the second round matches of Copa Libertadores 1994, Copa Libertadores 2005 and Copa Libertadores 2006.

The most recent final match featuring both teams was the 2022 Campeonato Paulista’s won by Palmeiras. The first leg was held on 30 March 2022, and São Paulo FC defeated Palmeiras by 3-1. The second leg was held on 3 April 2022 and Palmeiras defeated their rivals by 4-0.

Other rivals

The success of Palmeiras as a football club is consistently growing across all categories in the recent years, while club’s main rivals are getting behind due to their continuous absences in the decisive stages of top-tier championships. As a consequence, the club is observing the rise of new rivals outside the State and even across the continent.

In Brazil, Palmeiras’ main opponent in the last five years has been Clube de Regatas Flamengo. The most important final match between the two clubs was the 2021 Copa Libertadores Final won by Palmeiras by 2–1. The most recent final match between Palmeiras and Flamengo was the 2023 Supercopa do Brasil, also won by Palmeiras by 4-3.

Clube Atletico Mineiro is another rising power in Brazil. Palmeiras defeated Atlético Mineiro in the 2021 Copa Libertadores semifinals and in the 2022 Copa Libertadores quarter finals, the most recent international matches between the two clubs.

In South America, the club's main opponents are River Plate and Boca Juniors.

Official mascot
The club's official mascots are a green parakeet, named Periquito, and a pig, named Gobatto.

In 1986, at the Campeonato Paulista playoffs, supporters adopted the pig as their mascot. Although the parakeet is the official mascot, fans will refer to and yell: "PORCO!" (Pig) enthusiastically during matches, as the pig became their preferred mascot.

On November 6, 2016, Palmeiras incorporated the pig as one of the official mascots of the club.

Media

Palmeiras official YouTube channel, TV Palmeiras, has more than 1.8 million subscribers. The channel often exhibits highlights of the training sessions, pre-game preparations, post-game interviews, history facts, etc.

Palmeiras official Instagram account, Palmeiras, has more than 4.4 million subscribers.

Some other channels are dedicated to Palmeiras, for example the PodPorco, which is a podcast managed by Palmeiras fans with the purpose of interviewing people identified with the club, including players, former managers, journalists, famous supporters, etc.

Anthem

Palmeiras' anthem was composed in 1949 by conductor Antonio Sergi. Sergi also wrote the lyrics for the anthem, but did that under the pseudonym Gennaro Rodrigues.

Quando surge o alviverde imponente
(When the imposing white-green emerges)
No gramado em que a luta o aguarda
(On the pitch where battle awaits)
Sabe bem o que vem pela frente
(Aware of what lies before it)
Que a dureza do prélio não tarda
(That the struggle of the game is approaching)

E o Palmeiras no ardor da partida
(And Palmeiras, in the heat of the match)
Transformando a lealdade em padrão
(Making loyalty its norm)
Sabe sempre levar de vencida
(Always knows how to emerge victorious)
E mostrar que de fato é campeão
(And show that it's indeed the champion)

Defesa que ninguém passa
(Impenetrable defense)
Linha atacante de raça
(Vigorous attacking line)
Torcida que canta e vibra
(Singing, cheering supporters)

Por nosso alviverde inteiro
(For our white-green as a whole)
Que sabe ser brasileiro
(That knows how to be Brazilian)
Ostentando a sua fibra
(Boasting its fiber)

Celebrities supporting Palmeiras

André Rienzo - Brazilian professional baseball pitcher
Anthony Mackie - American Actor
Branco Mello - Brazilian musician and actor
Camila Brait - Brazilian Volleyball Player
Chael Sonnen - American retired mixed martial artist
Chico Anysio - Brazilian actor, comedian, writer and composer
Derrick Green - American Singer
Flávio Saretta - Brazilian Tennis Player
Gianne Albertoni - Brazilian actress, model and TV host
Hugo Hoyama - Brazilian table tennis player
Igor Cavalera - Brazilian drummer
Jaqueline Carvalho - Brazilian Volleyball Player and Olympic medalist
João Gordo - Brazilian vocalist and TV host
Joelmir Beting - Brazilian Journalist
José Serra - Brazilian Politician, former São Paulo State Governor, former São Paulo City Mayor and former Ministry of International Affairs
Kevin McHale - American actor
Lando Norris - British Formula 1 Driver
Magic Paula -  Brazilian women's basketball player
Mauro Beting -  Brazilian journalist and writer
Max Cavalera - Brazilian singer and guitarist
Mike Patton - American singer
Pietro Fittipaldi - Brazilian-American racing driver
Ratinho - Brazilian television presenter and businessman
Roberto Carlos - Brazilian singer
Sandro Dias - Brazilian skateboarder
Sérgio Reis - Brazilian sertanejo singer, actor and politician
Thomaz Bellucci - Brazilian Tennis Player

Players

First-team squad
.

Reserve team

On loan

Notable players

Management

Current staff

Presidents
The club associates congregate in a general assembly every four years to elect the seventy-six members of the Conselho Deliberativo (Deliberating Council) who in their turn chose amongst them a president for a two-year mandate. As of 2006 the president can only be re-elected once.

These are all Palmeiras presidents since the club's foundation:

Records

Top scorers

These are Palmeiras's top scorers since its foundation (data as of 1 February 2016):

Leading goalscorers in the National League, by season

Honours
The following information is a list of all the honours of Palmeiras since the club was founded.

Major competitions

 
  shared record

Other

International
 Ramón de Carranza Trophy (3): 1969, 1974, 1975
 Brasil-Argentina Tournament (2): 1936, 1945
 Mission Tournament (1): 1947
 Mexico Tournament (1): 1959
 Manizales City Tournament (1): 1962
 Lima City Cup (1): 1962
 Five Clubs Mexico Cup (1): 1963
 Firenze Cup (1): 1963
 João Havelange Four International Clubs Tournament (1): 1966
 Brazil-Japan Cup (1): 2016
 Barcelona Cup (1): 1969
 Greece Cup (1): 1970
 March del Plata Tournament (1): 1972
 Italian Immigration Cup (1): 1975
 Kirin Cup (1): 1978*
 Euro-America Cup (3): 1991, 1996, 2014
 Nagoya Cup (1): 1994
 Brazil-Italy Cup (1): 1994
 Naranja Cup (1): 1997
 Friendship Tournament (1): 1997
 Lev Yashin Tournament (1): 1994
 Estudiantes Century Championship (1): 2015
 Copa Euro Americana (1): 2014
 Julinho Botelho Trophy (1): 2014
 Florida Cup (1): 2020

National
 Porto Alegre Cup (1): 1936
 Paraná Tournament (1): 1938
 Fortaleza Tournament (1): 1938
 Pacaembu Stadium Cup (1): 1940
 Belo Horizonte Tournament (1): 1945
 Rio Grande do Sul Tournament (1): 1964
 Four Clubs Cup São PauloxRio (1): 1952
 Recife Cup (1): 1955
 Maringá Tournament (1): 1969
 Paraná Four Clubs Cup (1): 1984
 Goiás Tournament (1): 1997
 Torneio Maria Quitéria (1): 1997
 Taça dos Invictos (4): 1934, 1972, 1973, 1989
 Taça dos Campeões Estaduais Rio–São Paulo (4): 1926, 1934, 1942, 1947
 Torneio Início Paulista (8): 1927, 1930, 1935, 1937, 1939, 1942, 1946, 1969
 Taça Cidade de São Paulo: 4 1945, 1946, 1950, 1951
 Taça Governador do Estado: 1 1972

* 1978 Kirin Cup Shared with Borussia Mönchengladbach.

Women's

Palmeiras B Team

For many years, Palmeiras had a "second" team that played in the lower divisions of the Paulista Championship. The team was dissolved at the end of the Paulista 2013.

Other sports
Palmeiras has athletic departments in many sports, such as aikido, athletics, archery, boxing, american football, futsal, judo, karate, taekwondo, tennis, volleyball and weightlifting . The club has also a victorious tradition in rink hockey and basketball. Palmeiras has in it history 2 Brazilian Roller Hockey National Championships, being one of the main teams from São Paulo.

Basketball team

Leandro Barbosa and Oscar Schmidt, two of the best Brazilian basketball players of all time, started their careers at Palmeiras.

Notes

References

External links

  
 Anything Palmeiras 
 FIFA Classic Club

 
Football clubs in São Paulo (state)
Association football clubs established in 1914
Italian-Brazilian culture
Diaspora football clubs in Brazil
Multi-sport clubs in Brazil
Italian association football clubs outside Italy
P
P
P
Copa do Brasil winning clubs
Campeonato Brasileiro Série A winning clubs